Alpine skiing at the 2002 Winter Olympics consisted of ten events held February 10–23 in the United States near Salt Lake City, Utah. The downhill, super-G, and combined events were held at Snowbasin, the giant slaloms at Park City, and the slaloms at adjacent Deer Valley.

Medal table

Source:

Men's events 

Source:

Women's events 

Source:

Participating NOCs 
Fifty nations competed in the alpine skiing events at Salt Lake City.

Course information

Snowbasin hosted the downhill, super-G, and combined events; the giant slaloms were at Park City and the slaloms at adjacent Deer Valley
Source:

See also
Alpine skiing at the 2002 Winter Paralympics

References

External links
FIS-Ski.com – alpine skiing – 2002 Winter Olympics – Salt Lake City, Utah, USA
de.wikipedia.org – Olympische Winterspiele 2002 – Ski Alpin – 
Official Results Book – Alpine skiing

 
2002 Winter Olympics events
Alpine skiing at the Winter Olympics
Winter Olympics
Alpine skiing competitions in the United States
Skiing in Utah